Forever... The EP is an EP containing several international bonus tracks from Lisa "Left Eye" Lopes's remix/studio album Eye Legacy. It was released to eMusic and is available from iTunes in Australia.

Track listing

References

2009 debut EPs
Lisa Lopes albums
EPs published posthumously